The China Folk House Retreat is a Chinese folk house in Harpers Ferry, West Virginia, United States, reconstructed from its original location in Yunnan in China. A non-profit organization dismantled and rebuilt it piece by piece with the goal to improve U.S. understanding of Chinese culture.

History 
John Flower, director of Sidwell Friends School's Chinese studies program, and his wife Pamela Leonard started bringing students to Yunnan in 2012 as part of a China fieldwork program. In 2014 Flower, Leonard, and their students found the house in a small village named Cizhong in Jianchuan County of Yunnan, China. Before the COVID-19 pandemic, they brought dozens of 11th and 12th-grade students to Yunnan to experience the cultural and natural environment of this province every spring. The architectural style of this house is a blend of Han, Bai, Naxi and Tibetan styles.

The Cizhong Village is located in eastern Himalaya, alongside the Mekong River. It has a long history of Sino-foreign cultural exchanges. When they visited the village, Zhang Jianhua, owner of the house, invited them to his home. Zhang told them that the house was built in 1989, and would be flooded by a new hydroelectric power station. While the government built a new house for him one kilometer away, Flower came up with the idea of dismantling the house and rebuilding it in the United States. This house was built using mortise and tenon structure, which made it easy to be dismantled.

Logistics 
Flower and his students visited Zhang several times and eventually bought the house from him. After measurements and photographing, the whole house was dismantled, sent to Tianjin and shipped to Baltimore, and finally to West Virginia. Since 2017, they have spent several years rebuilding the house in Harpers Ferry, at the Friends Wilderness Center, following the traditional Chinese method of building. For the development of this project, Flower and Leonard formed the China Folk House Retreat.

Activities 
The Chinese Ambassador Qin Gang visited it in June 2022.

Pamela Leonard serves as the CEO of the organization.

On November 2, 2022, Kunming University of Science and Technology, the Linden Centre and Sidwell Friends School held an online seminar on traditional Yunnan architecture, where the Chinese residential projects were discussed. Kunming University of Science and Technology will donate a batch of tiles to the project for the reconstruction.

References

External links
 Official website
 
 A China folk house in West Virginia bridges two countries – China Daily video, November 9, 2022

Non-profit organizations based in West Virginia
Chinese culture
Cultural promotion organizations
China–United States relations
Cultural heritage conservation
Houses in West Virginia
Buildings and structures in Harpers Ferry, West Virginia